Two-state (or variants) may refer to:

 Two-state quantum system, in physics
 Two-state trajectory in biophysics
 Two-state solution, a proposed solution to the Israeli-Palestinian conflict
 2 States: The Story of My Marriage, a novel by Chetan Bhagat
 2 States (2014 film), a Bollywood film based on the novel
 2 States (2018 film), a Tollywood remake film
 2 States (2020 film), a Malayalam-language film

See also
 Two Nations theory (disambiguation)
 Two Chinas